Strophitus subvexus is a species of freshwater mussel, an aquatic bivalve mollusk in the family Unionidae, the river mussels.

This species is endemic to the United States.

References

Unionidae
Molluscs of the United States
Bivalves described in 1834
Taxonomy articles created by Polbot